HYW may refer to:
 Conway–Horry County Airport, in South Carolina, United States
 Hinchley Wood railway station, in England
 Hundred Years' War
 Western Armenian, a form of modern Armenian language (ISO 639-3 code: "HYW")